Railways of Australia (ROA) was an association of railways operators. It was established in November 1963 when the government railway operators of Australia and New Zealand decided to unite to promote the industry on a national scale.

The inaugural members were the Commonwealth Railways, New South Wales Government Railways, New Zealand Railways Department, Queensland Railways, South Australian Railways, Tasmanian Government Railways, Victorian Railways and Western Australian Government Railways. Headquartered in Melbourne, it also maintained a sales office in London, England.

The Indian Pacific passenger train that was jointly operated by four operators, launched in 1970, carried Railways of Australia branding on its carriages.

When most of the government train operators were privatised in the 1990s, Railways of Australia was superseded by the Australasian Railway Association, which  comprised 150 member organisations, including listed and private rail-related companies, government agencies and franchisees, passenger and freight operators, track owners and managers, suppliers, manufacturers, contractors and consultants.

Periodical
Beginning in 1964, the ROA published Network, initially published monthly; in the 1980s it became quarterly. In 1997 it was renamed Network Rail, becoming a bi-monthly publication. Publication ended in 1999.

References

Defunct railway companies of Australia
Organizations established in 1963
1963 establishments in Australia